Zaitun 'Toni' Kasim (1966 – 4 June 2008) was a Malaysian human rights activist and politician. She was the first candidate to run for election under the Women's Candidacy Initiative, a group of Malaysian women activists. She was active with several sustainable development programmes including the Centre for Independent Journalism, Suara Rakyat Malaysia (SUARAM), Amnesty International and the All Women's Action Society (AWAM), as well as Sisters in Islam.

Election Results

References 

Malaysian women activists
21st-century Malaysian women politicians
Malaysian women's rights activists
1966 births
2008 deaths
Independent politicians in Malaysia
20th-century Malaysian women politicians
20th-century Malaysian politicians
Malaysian human rights activists